Adelaide II (1045 – 11 January 1096), a member of the Salian dynasty, was Abbess of Gandersheim from 1061 and Abbess of Quedlinburg from 1063 until her death.

Family
Adelaide was born about September/October 1045, presumably at the Imperial Palace of Goslar, as the first child of King Henry III of Germany (1016–1056) from his second marriage with the French princess Agnes of Poitou (c.1025–1077), a daughter of Duke William V of Aquitaine. Henry had vainly hoped for a male heir to the throne; unsettled, the royal couple headed for their coronation by Pope Clement II in Rome the following year. Not until 1050, a son, Henry IV, was born, to the great relief of his parents. Adelaide's father died in 1056, leaving their minor son and his siblings under the regency of the dowager empress.

Abbacy
Adelaide had an elder half-sister, Beatrice (1037–1061), whom she subsequently succeeded in her offices: in 1061, she was elected successor to Beatrice as Imperial Abbess of Gandersheim. Two years later, Adelaide succeeded her half-sister as Princess-Abbess of Quedlinburg; she was possibly ordained in Goslar Cathedral at Pentecost 1063, witnessing the violent Precedence Dispute.

In Gandersheim, already the appointment of Beatrice in 1043 (at the age of seven) by King Henry III had caused trouble with the canonesses insisting on their autonomy and electoral rights. The cause was taken up by Pope Stephen IX who decided that certain Gandersheim fiefs should not to be leased by the abbess, however, the conflict flared up again during Adelheid's incumbency. According to the medieval chronicler Lambert of Hersfeld, the Quedlinburg Collegiate Church of St. Servatius burnt down in 1070 and had to be rebuilt. Likewise, a great fire broke out in Gandersheim in 1081 and destroyed the abbey, so she had the foundations reconstructed. In 1071, Adelheid was present at the consecration of Halberstadt Cathedral by Bishop Burchard II.

Like her half-sister and predecessor, she remained a reliable support of the Salian rule and backed her brother Henry IV throughout the long Investiture Controversy with Pope Gregory VII as well as in the Saxon Rebellion from 1073 onwards, while Bruno the Saxon accuses Henry to have his sister violated by his henchmen. In 1088, Adelaide's brother used Quedlinburg Abbey for a trial against the rebellious margrave Egbert II of Meissen, who had unsuccessfully laid siege to the convent; according to reports by Bernold of Constance, Adelaide was also involved in Egbert's assassination two years later.

Adelaide died on 11 January 1096 at Quedlinburg Abbey, where she was buried in the Collegiate Church alongside her predecessors Adelaide I and Beatrice. Her niece Agnes, daughter of her sister Judith of Swabia, succeeded her as abbess of both Gandersheim and Quedlinburg in 1110/11.

References

1045 births
11th-century German abbesses
Salian dynasty
Abbesses of Quedlinburg
1096 deaths
German princesses
Abbesses of Gandersheim
Daughters of emperors
Daughters of kings